Ashkhen (flourished second half of the 3rd century & first half of the 4th century) was the Queen of Armenia and a member of the Arsacid dynasty by marriage to King Tiridates III of Armenia.

Family and origins 
Ashkhen was a monarch of Sarmatian origins. She was the daughter and is the known child of the King of the Alans, Ashkatar who is also known as Ashkhadar by an unnamed wife. Ashkhen was born at an unknown date between about 260-280 and was raised in the Alani Kingdom. Little is known on her early life, prior to marrying Tiridates III.

The name Ashkhen is a female Armenian name. The name derives from the word akhsen ‘grey’, or Zend akhsaena which means ‘black’ or ‘bluish-black’. The name may also come from the word khset or Zend khsaeta ‘fiery red’. Ashkhen may have come from the name Ashkhadar.

Biography 

Tiridates III served as a Roman Client King of Armenia from 287 to 330. In 297, Tiridates III married Ashkhen when Tiridates III had his guarantee of Armenian autonomy from the Romans and he was free of Sassanid plotting and the incursions of the Caucasian tribes ceased. When Tiridates III had sent for Ashkhen to marry as his wife, he sent his general Smbat who was the father of Bagarat to bring Ashkhen from the Alani Kingdom. When Ashkhen had come to Armenia, Tiridates III ordered Ashkhen to be inscribed as an Arsacid to be vested with purple and to crowned in order to become the king's bride. Ashkhen was given the titles of Arsacian and Queen. These titles that Ashkhen was given were used to express the highest honors to which a woman could be raised in Armenia. With him, Ashkhen had three children: a son called Khosrov III, a daughter called Salome and an unnamed daughter who married St. Husik I, one of the earlier Catholicoi of the Armenian Apostolic Church.

Ashkhen; Tiridates III; her sister-in-law Khosrovidukht; her children with many Armenians in that period were followers of the religion of Zoroastrianism. Zoroastrianism was the head religion of the Armenian state. In Tiridates III's reign, Christian persecutions occurred throughout the Roman Empire. As her husband was an ally to Rome, he participated in these events. Tiridates III ordered the execution of many Christians, who opposed to worship the various pagan religions in the Roman Empire. These Christians who Tiridates III had harshly persecuted lived in Armenia or had fled to the country to escape the religious massacres. Among his victims, Tiridates III was responsible for the martyrdom of the Hripsimeyan nuns and condemning Gregory the Illuminator to the Khor Virap a deep underground dungeon.

After the martyrdom of the Hripsimeyan nuns, Tiridates III had lost his sanity and had become mentally ill. Tiridates III adopted the behaviour of a wild boar, aimlessly wandering around in the forest. Khosrovidukht out of concerned for her brother, did everything to bring her brother back to sanity.

In her sleep Khosrovidukht, had a dream where appeared to her a vision from God. She saw in her dream a man in the likeness of light came to her and told her "there is no other cure for these torments that have come upon you, unless you send to the city of Artashat and bring thence the prisoner Gregory. When he comes he will teach you the remedy for your ills." Khosrovidukht had this vision five times. She came to speak to the people about her vision and the populace heard this and they began to mock her words. They began to say to her: "You too then are mad. Some demon has possessed you. How is it, because it is fifteen years since they threw him into the terribly pit, that you say he is alive? Where would even his bones be? For on the same day when they put him down there, he would have immediately dropped dead at the very sight of the snakes."

With threats, if she unless she reported it immediately she would have suffered great torments and the afflictions of the people and of the king would become even worse, with death and various tortures. Khosrovidukht came forward again in great fear and hesitation and told Tiridates III about her vision. Khosrovidukht in character was a modest maiden like a nun and did not all have an open mouth like other women.

When Khosrovidukht told her brother about her visions, Tiridates III straight away sent her foster father Awtay to Artashat to Gregory out of the dungeon and deep pit. When Gregory was brought to Tiridates III, he was in imprisonment for 15 years, although he was malnourished the odds of him being alive was slim. It is believed that Khosrovidukht or a woman, secretly fed Gregory while during his imprisonment. While her brother ordered the persecutions of Christians, Ashkhen and Khosrovidukht most probably had already accepted Christianity through the efforts of the Hripsimeyan nuns and others in the Armenian Christian underground. There is a possibility that Ashkhen and Khosrovidukht may have protected Christians from religious persecutions.

After Gregory with brought to Tiridates III, he was miraculously cured of his illness in 301. Tiridates III was persuaded by the power of the cure, proclaimed immediately Christianity as the official religion of the state in Armenia. Thus Armenia became the first nation to officially adopt Christianity and Gregory was appointed Catholicos of the Armenian Apostolic Church. Tiridates III recovered from his illness he became a passionate Christian and the Christian persecutions had ended. Sometime after Tiridates III's baptism, Gregory baptised Tiridates III's family including Ashkhen, his entire court and his army on the Euphrates River.

After 301 til her death, possibly around 330, Ashkhen, Tiridates III and Khosrovidukht and their family dedicated the rest of their lives to the service of Jesus Christ. As Tiridates III encouraged and supported the spread of Christianity, Ashkhen, Tiridates III and Khosrovidukht participated in the construction of the Etchmiadzin Cathedral, Saint Gayane Church, Saint Hripsime Church and the Shoghakat Church. During the construction of Saint Gayane and Saint Hripsime Churches, Ashkhen and Khosrovidukht donated their jewels for the expenses for the church.

Towards the end of her life Ashkhen with Khosrovidukht retired to the castle of Garni. Ashkhen along with Khosrovidukht are regarded as prominent figures in Armenian society and are significant figures in Christianity in Armenia. Ashkhen, Tiridates III and Khosrovidukht are Saints in the Armenian Apostolic Church and their feast day is on the Saturday after the fifth Sunday after Pentecost. On this feast day To the Kings is sung. Their feast day is usually around June 30.

See also
Armenian Apostolic Church
Arsacid dynasty of Armenia
Saint Gregory the Illuminator Cathedral, Yerevan

References

Sources
 Armenian female names – Ashkhen
 Ashkhen's genealogy at Rootsweb
 Ashkhadar's genealogy at Rootsweb
 Father M. Chamich, History of Armenia from BC 2247 to the year of Christ 1780 or 1229 of the Armenian Era. Translated from the original Armenian, Johannes Avdall, Esq, Bishop's College Press, 1827 
 R.W. Thomson, Agathangelo's History of the Armenians, SUNY Press, 1976
 B. Eghiayean, Heroes of Hayastan: a dramatic novel history of Armenia, Armenian National Fund, 1993
 M.H. Dodgeon & S.N.C Lieu, The Roman Eastern Frontier and the Persian Wars AD 226–363, A documentary History Compiled and edited, Routledge, 1994
 M. Vahan Kurkjian, A History of Armenia, Indo-European Publishing, 2008

Alanic women
Armenian saints
Armenian queens consort
4th-century Christian saints
3rd-century monarchs in the Middle East
4th-century monarchs in the Middle East
Armenian Apostolic Christians
Roman client rulers
3rd-century Iranian people
4th-century Iranian people
3rd-century women
4th-century women
Saints of the Armenian Apostolic Church